Beach Bites with Katie Lee is an American food travelogue television series that airs on Cooking Channel. It is presented by chef Katie Lee. The series features Lee traveling to different beach destinations and eating the local cuisine.

The pilot episode of Beach Bites aired on August 21, 2015. The series officially premiered on June 2, 2016.

Episodes

Season 1 (2015–2016) 

– Sources:

References

External links
 
 
 bstventertainment.com

2010s American reality television series
2015 American television series debuts
Cooking Channel original programming
English-language television shows
Food travelogue television series
2018 American television series endings